Mastax ornatella is a species of beetle in the family Carabidae found in Angola, Namibia, South Africa and Zimbabwe.

References

Mastax ornatella
Beetles of Africa
Beetles described in 1848